Delima is a genus of gastropods belonging to the family Clausiliidae.

The species of this genus are found in Europe, Western Asia.

Species:

Delima albocincta 
Delima amoena 
Delima bilabiata 
Delima binotata 
Delima blanda 
Delima edmibrani 
Delima giselae 
Delima helenae 
Delima hiltrudis 
Delima laevissima 
Delima latilabris 
Delima montenegrina 
Delima pachystoma 
Delima pellucida 
Delima pfeifferi 
Delima semirugata 
Delima subcylindrica 
Delima vidovichii

References

Clausiliidae